Chulmleigh is a small Saxon hilltop market town and civil parish located in North Devon in the heart of the English county of Devon.

History
The first documentary reference to the place is in the Domesday Book of 1086 where it is recorded as Calmonlevge. The name derives from the Old English personal name Ceolmund and the common place-name element leah which has various meanings including "woodland", "a woodland clearing" and "meadow". At the time of Domesday the land was held by Baldwin the Sheriff from whom it passed to the Courtenay family, who made the settlement a borough in the mid-thirteenth century. Situated on the main road between Exeter and Barnstaple, Chulmleigh thrived during the 17th and 18th centuries; it was a centre of wool production, had a good market and three cattle fairs. The wool trade had ceased by the early 19th century, but the road traffic kept the town prosperous until a new turnpike road bypassed the town in about 1830 and the opening in 1854 of the North Devon Railway also contributed to its decline.

Description
The parish is surrounded, clockwise from the north by the parishes of King's Nympton, Romansleigh, Meshaw, East Worlington, Chawleigh, Wembworthy (a short border only), Ashreigney, Burrington, and Chittlehamholt. In 2001 the population of the parish was 1,308, decreasing to 1,017 at the 2011 census. An electoral ward with the same name also exists whose total population at the same census was 2,081.

Because of its former prosperity the town has several fine old buildings, many constructed of cob and thatch. The parish church dedicated to StMary Magdalene was originally a collegiate church and was founded early. It was completely rebuilt in the 15th century and partially restored in 1881.

Chulmleigh has a retained fire station which is part of Devon and Somerset Fire and Rescue Service. The secondary school is Chulmleigh College, it has been amongst the highest in Devon's GCSE league tables. The town's pub is the Old Court House. on South Molton Street.

Local businesses and organisations include a health centre, a dentist, a butcher, Chulmleigh Cricket Club, Winston Pincombe, a deli, an antiques shop, a florists, a hair and beauty salon, a bakery and Chulmleigh Golf Course.

Transport 
Eggesford railway station is closer to the town.

Historic estates
Colleton, Chulmleigh

Notes

References

External links

 Chulmleigh Homepage

 Historic Chulmleigh Cottage, built for the workers of Eggesford House (1840s)

 
Towns in Devon
North Devon